Maria Lewis is an author, screenwriter and pop culture commentator from Australia.

Early life and education 
Lewis was born in New Zealand on the South Island before moving to the Gold Coast, Queensland. She started her journalism career as a teenager at the Gold Coast Bulletin, covering crime and general news. Her work on pop culture has appeared in publications such as Empire Magazine, Penthouse, Junkee, New York Post, The Guardian, i09, The Daily and Sunday Telegraph, BuzzFeed, and others.

Career 
Lewis was known for her role as a panelist, presenter, writer and producer on SBS Viceland's nightly news program The Feed and is an ambassador for the Australian Stroke Foundation after surviving a Transient ischemic attack (TIA) when she was twenty-two. She was the writer, researcher, host and producer of audio documentaries Josie and the Podcats - which looked at the 2001 cult film, Josie and the Pussycats - and The Phantom Never Dies - about the world’s first superhero, The Phantom. Lewis won the 2022 Audio - Non-Fiction AWGIE Award for episode two of the series - The Phantom Never Dies: ‘Fantomen’  - and silver at the Australian Podcast Awards for Best Arts & Culture program, along with a nomination for Presenter Of The Year at the Radio Today Podcast Awards. 

She primarily works as a screenwriter for film and television, including projects for AMC, Netflix, SBS, Ubisoft, ABC, Stan, DC Comics, and has curated seasons at the Australian Centre for the Moving Image on Creature From The Black Lagoon, Aussie neo-noir (titled Yeah Noir), Australian rom-coms (Yeah The Girls) and cult classics like Birds Of Prey, Candyman and Mad Max: Fury Road (ACMI Watches). Her Aurealis Award and Ditmar Award-nominated short story The House That Hungers was adapted into a 2023 short film starring Kimie Tsuakoshi in the lead role, with Lewis serving as writer, director, and producer.

Writing 
Lewis is the author of several award-winning books and short stories. Her debut novel Who's Afraid? was published globally in 2015 and kickstarted the eight-book Supernatural Sisters series which "examined the feminine grotesque and the idea of female monsters". It featured a different type of classic mythological monster as the main character of each story, with characters and timelines overlapping before the finale, Her Fierce Creatures, which was published in 2022. The series was nominated for several awards, including an Aurealis Award in 2018 for Best Horror Novel for Who's Afraid Too?, an Aurealis Award for Best Fantasy Novel for The Wailing Woman in 2020 -  about a family of banshee sisters - and The Rose Daughter in 2022 respectively. Her fourth book, The Witch Who Courted Death, won the Aurealis Award for Best Fantasy Novel in 2019.

Lewis' first crime-fiction novel - The Graveyard Shift - was acquired by Angry Robot and announced on Halloween 2022, with The Bookseller calling it “slasher-crime for the millennial generation”. She told the publication: “The Graveyard Shift is the realisation of a lifelong dream of mine: to write a slasher". She was named as the author of Mockingbird: Strike Out, a new novel from Marvel featuring S.H.I.E.L.D. Agent and super-spy Bobbi Morse. The novel is due for publication in 2023 and sees her team up with S.T.R.I.K.E.'s Lance Hunter following her divorce from Clint Barton aka Hawkeye.

Bibliography

Novels 

 Mockingbird: Strike Out (Lewis: June 6, 2023: Aconyte)
 The Graveyard Shift (Lewis: October 10, 2023, Angry Robot)

Supernatural Sisters
 Who's Afraid? - Supernatural Sisters #1 (Lewis: December 12, 2015: Hachette Australia) (Lewis: July 14, 2016: Piatkus UK)
 Who's Afraid Too? - Supernatural Sisters #2 (Lewis: Jan 21, 2017: Hachette Australia) (Lewis: July 14, 2017: Piatkus UK)
 It Came From The Deep - Supernatural Sisters #3 (Lewis: October 21, 2017: IngramSpark)
The Witch Who Courted Death - Supernatural Sisters #4 (Lewis: October 31, 2018: Hachette Australia) (Lewis: March 9, 2019: Piatkus UK)
The Wailing Woman - Supernatural Sisters #5 (Lewis: November 1, 2019: Hachette Australia) (Lewis: March 9, 2020: Piatkus UK)
Who's Still Afraid? - Supernatural Sisters #6 (Lewis: October 21, 2020: IngramSpark)
The Rose Daughter - Supernatural Sisters #7 (Lewis: April 6, 2021: Hachette Australia) (Lewis: October 21, 2021: Piatkus UK)
Her Fierce Creatures - - Supernatural Sisters #8 (Lewis: March 13, 2022: Hachette Australia) (Lewis: October 4, 2022: Piatkus UK)

Short Stories 
 Hot Stuff: Surfing Love (Caruso, Lewis, Sinclair. Woods: Jan 1, 2016: HarperCollins Publishers Australia)
 Doing It: A Sex Positive Anthology (Pickering, Ford, Lewis et al: August 29, 2016: University Of Queensland Press)
 And Then... The Great Big Book Of Awesome Adventure Tales: Volume 2 (Goodman, Lewis, Nette et al.: August 7, 2017: Clan Destine Press) 
Tales From Kayfabia: The Unfortunate Origins of Jimmy Havoc Audio Short Story (Lewis: November 2, 2018: Conco and the Fudge)
The Otherworld Sister - Supernatural Sisters #4.5 (Lewis: September 21, 2020: IngramSpark) 
The House That Hungers (Lewis: November 13, 2021: Aurealis #146)
Damnation Games (Baxter, Lee, Anderton, Lewis et al: November 1, 2022: Clan Destine Press)

References 

Living people
21st-century Australian women writers
Australian women short story writers
Women science fiction and fantasy writers
Australian people of Māori descent
People from the Gold Coast, Queensland
People from Arrowtown
21st-century Australian short story writers
Year of birth missing (living people)